The National Army Museum is the British Army's central museum. It is located in the Chelsea district of central London, adjacent to the Royal Hospital Chelsea, the home of the "Chelsea Pensioners". The museum is a non-departmental public body. It is usually open to the public from 10:00 to 17:30, except on 25–26 December and 1 January. Admission is free.

Its remit for the overall history of British land forces contrasts with those of other military museums in the United Kingdom concentrating on the history of individual corps and regiments of the British Army. It also differs from the subject matter of the Imperial War Museum, another national museum in London, which has a wider remit of theme (war experiences of British civilians and military personnel from all three services) but a narrower remit of time (after 1914).

History
The National Army Museum was first conceived in the late 1950s, and owes its existence to the persistent hard work of Field Marshal Sir Gerald Templer, who did most of the fundraising for it. It was established by Royal Charter in 1960, with the intention of collecting, preserving, and exhibiting objects and records relating to the Regular and Auxiliary forces of the British Army and of the Commonwealth, and to encourage research into their history and traditions. It was initially established in 1960 in temporary accommodation at the former No.1 Riding School at the Royal Military Academy Sandhurst.

A new purpose-built building, designed in brutalist style by William Holford & Partners, was started in 1961 on a site which had previously formed part of the old infirmary of the Royal Hospital Chelsea. The new building was completed ten years later and opened by the Queen on 11 November 1971.

One director, Ian Robertson, initiated a programme to establish an outpost of the Museum in the garrison town of Catterick, North Yorkshire, to be known as National Army Museum North, on the model of Imperial War Museum's establishment of the Imperial War Museum North in Manchester. A large site was chosen near Marne Barracks, beside the A1, and in 2002 Simon Pierce of Austin-Smith:Lord was chosen as the new museum's architect. However, funding and planning issues later led to the cancellation of the plan in 2003. The National Army Museum instead underwent a major redevelopment of its gallery and corridor displays at Chelsea from 2006 onwards, establishing new displays in existing permanent display areas, converting the corridors from oil-painting displays to permanent-exhibition spaces, and producing new temporary and permanent display areas on the third floor. This redisplay concluded with the opening of the new permanent National Service gallery in October 2010, though a further phase of redevelopment followed from 2011 onwards.

Refurbishment
From 1 May 2014 until 30 March 2017, the museum was closed to the public for a major rebuilding programme. 

The refurbishment cost £23.75 million, of which £11.5 million was financed by the Heritage Lottery Fund: the works created five galleries that cover British military history from the English Civil War up to modern day. The rebuilding was overseen by BDP architects, and specialist museum design company, Event Communications.

Esther Dugdale from Event Communications noted that "The new museum aims to create a dialogue about the army – not to promote it, but bring the discussion of it into the public domain", and "The displays express its multi-layered history and relationship with the public. It does not shy away from some of the more difficult issues, but also gives a voice to the many who have served and what they have experienced". Dugdale also stated that the new design would be an "immersive experience", allowing visitors to ride simulated tanks, load rifles and understand war tactics in a technology-driven 3D environment.

In early March 2017, the Queen reopened the Museum, marking the completion of a three-year renovation. However, in an article in The Spectator, historian and Museum trustee Andrew Roberts severely criticised the new displays, stating: "Instead of seeing artefacts in a historical context, as part of a chronological narrative, the visitor is forced to explore themes, and as ever this has provided an opening for guilt, apology and political correctness"; he also pointed to incorrect statements, and suggested a generalised dumbing-down, writing of medal displays: "we are not told in very many cases what they are or even who they were awarded to." In 2022, in a follow-up article, Roberts announced that under new director Brigadier Justin Maciejewski, (the first leader of the museum to have first-hand experience of soldiering), the museum had "returned to the aims of its Royal Charter, anchored itself to historical facts rather than contemporary politicised fashions," and telling the Army's story from "an evidence-based, objective perspective."

Galleries
The museum has five new galleries: Formation, Soldier, Global, Battle and Society.

Governance
The National Army Museum achieved devolved status as a non-departmental public body in 1983 under terms of the National Heritage Act. The annual Grant-in-Aid from the Ministry of Defence, is administered by the Director of the Museum on behalf of the governing body, the board of trustees of the National Army Museum.

Directors
Lieutenant-Colonel Charles Bernard Appleby  1971–1975
John Paris 1975–1982
William Reid  1982–1988
Ian Robertson  1988–2003†
Dr Alan Guy  2003–2010
Janice Murray 2010–2017
Justin Maciejewski 2018–

† = Died in post

Notes and references

Sources
 Chandler, D. G. "The National Army Museum." History Today. (Sep 1972), Vol. 22 Issue 9, pp. 664–668; online

External links

Review of the museum with photographs of each gallery

World War I museums in the United Kingdom
World War II museums in the United Kingdom
Army Museum, London
Ministry of Defence (United Kingdom)
Non-departmental public bodies of the United Kingdom government
Army museums in London
Museums in the Royal Borough of Kensington and Chelsea
Museums established in 1960
Musical instrument museums in England
1960 establishments in England
British Army
Chelsea, London